The 2006 European Tour was a concert tour by Elton John. After completing a string of dates in Las Vegas with the Red Piano shows Elton and the band travelled tour Europe.

Tour
The tour only visited four European countries: Ireland, England, Germany and France. The majority of the seventeen concerts were performed in England.

Elton later returned to Europe after performing more Red Piano concerts. Elton and the band visited Lithuania and Poland.

Set list
 "Bennie and the Jets"
 "Philadelphia Freedom"
 "Believe"
 "Daniel"
 "Rocket Man"
 "I Guess That's Why They Call It the Blues"
 "Weight of the World"
 "They Call Her the Cat"
 "Turn Out the Lights Out When You Leave"
 "The One"
 "Take Me to the Pilot"
 "Funeral for a Friend/Love Lies Bleeding"
 "Someone Saved My Life Tonight"
 "Tiny Dancer"
 "I Want Love"
 "Sorry Seems to Be the Hardest Word"
 "Blue Eyes"
 "Sacrifice"
 "Are You Ready for Love"
 "Sad Songs (Say So Much)"
 "I'm Still Standing"
 "The Bitch Is Back"
 "Saturday Night's Alright for Fighting"
Encore
"Don't Let the Sun Go Down on Me"
"Your Song"

Source:

Tour dates

Festivals and other miscellaneous performances

This concert was a part of "Sopot International Song Festival"

References

External links

 Information Site with Tour Dates

Elton John concert tours
2006 concert tours